Barberino di Mugello is a comune (municipality) in the Metropolitan City of Florence in the Italian region Tuscany, located about  north of Florence.   
Barberino di Mugello borders the following municipalities: Calenzano, Cantagallo, Castiglione dei Pepoli, Firenzuola, San Piero a Sieve, Scarperia, Vaiano, Vernio.

Sights include the Villa Medici of Cafaggiolo.

Twin towns
  Laurenzana, Italy

References

External links

 

 
Cities and towns in Tuscany